The 2014 Men's Hockey Champions Challenge was held from 26 April to 4 May 2014 in Kuantan, Malaysia. The tournament doubled as the qualifier to the 2016 Champions Trophy as the winner earned an automatic berth to compete.

South Korea won the tournament for the first time after defeating Canada 4–0 in the final, earning an automatic berth at the 2016 Champions Trophy after their absence in the previous two editions. Malaysia won the third place match by defeating Ireland 4–2 to claim their first ever Champions Challenge I medal.

Qualification
Even though Spain was automatically qualified as the highest ranked team not qualified for the next Champions Trophy or Champions Challenge I (this due to the withdrawal from participating at the 2012 Champions Trophy), they withdrew from participating. In addition, South Africa qualified as the seventh placed team in the previous edition, but also withdrew due to financial issues. Both teams were replaced by Poland and France, respectively. The following eight teams competed in this tournament.

 (Host nation)
 (Seventh in 2012 Champions Trophy)
 (Second in 2012 Champions Challenge I)
 (Third in 2012 Champions Challenge I)
 (Fifth in 2012 Champions Challenge I)
 (Sixth in 2012 Champions Challenge I)
 (Eighth in 2012 Champions Challenge I)
 (Highest ranked team not qualified for the next Champions Trophy or Champions Challenge I)

Results
All times are Malaysia Standard Time (UTC+08:00)

First round

Pool A

Pool B

Second round

Quarterfinals

Fifth to eighth place classification

Crossover

Seventh and eighth place

Fifth and sixth place

First to fourth place classification

Semifinals

Third and fourth place

Final

Awards
Post tournament awards.

Final ranking

References

External links
Official website

Men's Hockey Champions Challenge I
Champions Challenge I
Hockey
2014 Men's Hockey Champions Challenge I